The Explosive Freddy Cannon is the debut album of Freddy Cannon. Released in 1960, it spent one week at number one in the United Kingdom; it was Cannon's only number one album.  It was also the first rock 'n' roll album to reach No. 1 on the UK albums chart, in part due to its cheaper price.

Track listing
 "Boston (My Home Town)" (Bob Crewe, Frank Slay, Jr.) – 2:02
 "Kansas City" (Jerry Leiber & Mike Stoller) – 2:14
 "Sweet Georgia Brown" (Ben Bernie, Kenneth Casey, Maceo Pinkard) – 2:16
 "Way Down Yonder In New Orleans" (Henry Creamer, Turner Layton) – 2:29
 "St Louis Blues" (W. C. Handy) – 2:38
 "Indiana" (Ballard MacDonald, James F. Hanley) – 1:46
 "Chattanoogie Shoe Shine Boy" (Harry Stone, Jack Stapp) – 2:17
 "Deep in the Heart of Texas" (Don Swander, June Hershey) – 1:42
 "California Here I Come" (Al Jolson, B. G. De Sylva, Joseph Meyer) – 2:04
 "Okefenokee" (Crewe, Slay, Jr.) – 2:30
 "Carolina In The Morning" (Gus Kahn, Walter Donaldson) – 2:30
 "Tallahassee Lassie" (Crewe, Slay, Jr., Frederick A. Picariello) – 2:34

Personnel

Technical
 Bob Crewe, Frank Slay, Jr. – producers, arrangements
 Sid Bass – arrangements
 George Schowerer – engineer 
 Otto Fern – photography

Charts

Singles

References

1960 debut albums
Freddy Cannon albums
Philips Records albums
Albums produced by Bob Crewe